Bleach is the debut studio album by American rock band Nirvana, released on June 15, 1989, by Sub Pop. After the release of their debut single "Love Buzz" on Sub Pop in November 1988, Nirvana rehearsed for two to three weeks in preparation for recording a full-length album. The main recording sessions for Bleach took place at Reciprocal Recording in Seattle, Washington between December 1988 and January 1989. It is the only Nirvana album released on the Sub Pop label and their only album to feature drummer Chad Channing.

Bleach did not chart upon initial release, but was well received by critics. When reissued internationally by Geffen Records in 1992 following the success of Nirvana's second album, Nevermind, Bleach peaked at number 89 on the Billboard 200, number 33 on the UK Albums Chart, and number 34 on the Australian albums chart. In 2009, Sub Pop released a 20th anniversary edition of Bleach featuring a live recording of a 1990 Nirvana performance in Portland, Oregon as bonus material.

Bleach had sold 40,000 copies in North America before the release of Nevermind. It has since been certified platinum by the RIAA and has sold more than 1.9 million copies in the United States alone. It is Sub Pop's best-selling album to date and is unlikely to be surpassed by competitors. Frontman Kurt Cobain's death in April 1994 also led to a resurgence in the album's popularity, reaching number one on the Top Pop Catalog Albums chart. In April 2019, Bleach was ranked No. 13 on Rolling Stones 50 Greatest Grunge Albums list.

Recording
After the release of its debut single "Love Buzz" on Sub Pop in November 1988, Nirvana practiced for two to three weeks in preparation for recording a full-length album, even though Sub Pop had only requested an EP. The main sessions for Bleach took place at Reciprocal Recording Studios in Seattle, with local producer Jack Endino.

Nirvana began recording with a five-hour session on December 24, 1988. The band recorded again on December 29–31, and on January 14 and 24.  Three of the album's songs – "Floyd the Barber", "Paper Cuts", and "Downer" – were recorded during a previous session at Reciprocal Studios in January 1988, featuring Dale Crover on drums. Despite attempts to re-record them with new drummer Chad Channing, the band ultimately decided to remix the versions recorded with Crover for the final version of Bleach. "Big Long Now" was omitted from the album because vocalist/guitarist Kurt Cobain felt "there was already enough slow heavy stuff on Bleach, and he 'didn't want that song to go out'", according to Endino. The album was edited and sequenced, but Sub Pop head Bruce Pavitt ordered that the album be completely re-sequenced. The record was further delayed for several months until Sub Pop was able to secure sufficient funds to issue it.

Lead singer Kurt Cobain felt pressured to create music for Bleach that conformed to the grunge music style favored by his record label and the contemporary Seattle music scene. The album is regarded as quite negative and bleak; Cobain claimed that most of the lyrics were written the night before recording while he was feeling "pissed off", and that he did not regard them highly.

Endino billed the band thirty hours of recording at $606.17. Jason Everman, a guitarist who was impressed by Nirvana's demo with Dale Crover, supplied the money. He briefly joined the group as second guitarist. Everman was credited as a guitarist on the album sleeve, and is the other guitarist on the cover of the album, even though he did not perform on the album. Bassist Krist Novoselic explained, "We just wanted to make him feel at home in the band."

Music

According to Cobain, the music on Bleach conformed with the grunge genre Sub Pop heavily endorsed. "There was this pressure from Sub Pop and the grunge scene to play 'rock music'", Cobain said, and noted that he "[stripped] it down and [made] it sound like Aerosmith." Cobain also felt he had to fit the expectations of the grunge sound to build a fanbase, and hence suppressed his arty and pop songwriting traits while crafting the record. Krist Novoselic said in a 2001 interview with Rolling Stone that the band had played a tape in their tour van that had an album by the Smithereens on one side and one by the band Celtic Frost on the other, and noted that the combination probably played an influence as well. The songs were described as "deliberately bleak, claustrophobic, and lyrically sparse, with none of the manic derangement or sense of release of the live performance". Cobain said that the song structures were "one–dimensional", and said that he sought to present a more "polished and urbane side of himself".

Bleach was heavily influenced by the Seattle-based sludge metal scene of the late 1980s and early 1990s, pioneered by Melvins. Author Gillian G. Gaar wrote that Bleach "[has] its share – some would say more than its share – of dirty sludge", and Sub Pop describes the single Love Buzz/Big Cheese to be "heavy pop sludge."

Describing the various songs on Bleach, Christopher Sandford wrote: "'Paper Cuts' includes a folk-influence melody and ponderous rhythm of an early Led Zeppelin number; 'Mr. Moustache' addressed itself to Nirvana's male fans; 'Downer' showed the same exceptional contempt for the group's audience". Sandford felt "School" – which features only four lines of lyrics – was memorable for its chorus that "served as the rip". While "Scoff" is "a parting salvo at [Cobain's parents]", "Negative Creep" was written by Cobain about himself. According to Sandford, "About a Girl" has a "chiming melody and ironic chorus". In Sounds magazine, Keith Cameron said the song "was exhilarating and it was exciting because that was the nature of the music, but there was also an almost palpable sense of danger, that this whole thing could fall apart any second. There was never any relaxation from the first note to the last". In his book Nirvana: The Stories Behind Every Song, Chuck Crisafulli writes that the song "stands out in the Cobain canon as a song with a very specific genesis and a very real subject".

In one of his first interviews, Cobain told Sounds journalist John Robb, "When I write a song the lyrics are the least important thing. I can go through two or three different subjects in a song and the title can mean absolutely nothing at all. Sometimes I try to make things harder for myself, just to try to make myself a bit more angry. I try out a few subconscious things I suppose, like conflicts with other people. Most of the lyrics on the Bleach album are about my life in Aberdeen."

In 1993, Cobain told Spin that on Bleach he "didn't give a flying fuck what the lyrics were about" and claimed that 80 percent of the lyrics were written the night before recording. He was often still working on the words on the drive to the recording studio. He explained: "It was like I'm pissed off. Don't know what about. Let's just scream negative lyrics, and as long as they're not sexist and don't get too embarrassing it'll be okay. I don't hold any of those lyrics dear to me." Nirvana biographer Michael Azerrad noted that, nevertheless, many of the songs on the album reflected Cobain and various incidents in his life. "Mr. Moustache" was inspired by Cobain's dislike of macho behavior, while "School" was a critique of the Seattle music scene, particularly Sub Pop.

Release and promotion

The album cover was photographed by Cobain's then-girlfriend Tracy Marander during a concert at the Reko Muse art gallery in Olympia, Washington. On February 25, 1989, Nirvana played at venues on the west coast, including the University of Washington. The group began its first European tour, a double headliner with the band Tad, at the Riverside venue in Newcastle upon Tyne on October 23, 1989. On December 3, they played a "triumphant" set at the London Astoria. Christopher Sandford related: "when the style pundits noted Cobain's 'patent lumberjack shirts and ugly fifties geometric-patterned jerseys', seeing an example of 'low-couture chic' they missed the point that flannel shirts and sweaters were everyday dress in the marine climate of the Northwest". Cobain took note and said that he never intended to start a fad or act as a role model.

The album's working title was Too Many Humans. It was renamed Bleach after Cobain found an AIDS prevention poster while Nirvana was driving through San Francisco. The poster advised heroin addicts to bleach their needles before use, featuring the slogan "Bleach Your Works". In Australia, Bleach was released on Waterfront Records and re-issued on various colored covers and colored vinyl prior to 1992.

Due to increasing dissatisfaction with Everman over the course of the Bleach tour, Nirvana canceled the last few dates and drove back to Washington. No one told Everman he was fired at the time, while Everman later claimed that he actually quit the group. Although Sub Pop did not promote Bleach as much as other releases, it was a steady seller for a Sub Pop release. However, Cobain was upset by the label's lack of promotion and distribution for the album.

In April 1992, following the success of Nirvana's second album Nevermind, Sub Pop released a remastered version of Bleach on LP, CD and cassette. Geffen Records handled the international release. The CD version was packaged in a cardboard foldout case that included a bonus booklet filled with photos of the band from 1987 to 1990. For the 20th anniversary of the album, Sub Pop released on November 3, 2009 a deluxe reissue of Bleach featuring a March 2009 remastering from the original tapes by George Marino and a live recording of a 1990 show at Portland, Oregon's Pine Street Theatre. Everman is no longer given credit on the album, but can still be seen on the front cover and is given a special thanks in the booklet.

Reception

Bleach did not sell well but received positive reviews from critics when it was first released. It "became a moderate hit on college radio and the underground/DIY circuit", according to Charles M. Young in The New Rolling Stone Album Guide. In NME, Edwin Pouncey gave Bleach an eight-out-of-ten rating and wrote, "This is the biggest, baddest sound that Sub Pop have so far managed to unearth. So primitive that they manage to make label mates Mudhoney sound like Genesis, Nirvana turn up the volume and spit and claw their way to the top of the musical garbage heap." Melody Maker reviewer Push deemed Nirvana "the only Sub Pop act to date whose songs consistently equal the standard set by their mates Mudhoney". Thurston Moore of Sonic Youth was impressed by the album, finding it "primal" and the songwriting "completely melodious" but also "punk", and during the mastering of Sonic Youth's 1990 album Goo, Moore expressed his desire for a sound similar to that of Bleach.

In a retrospective review for AllMusic, Stephen Thomas Erlewine opined that "Kurt Cobain illustrated signs of his considerable songcraft" on Bleach, "particularly on the minor-key ballad 'About a Girl' and the dense churn of 'Blew'", summarizing the album as "a debut from a band that shows potential but haven't yet achieved it." Author Dave Thompson stated in 2000 that "history [wouldn't] hear a word against [the album]", but added that if "one just came down from a few decades on Mars, 42 minutes of growly, lo-fi probably wouldn't change your life too much". Robert Christgau wrote in The New Yorker, "Familiar now with Cobain's extraordinary gift, we can hear it loud and clear on the 1989 debut album, Bleach. Cobain's gigantic, goofy, bass-playing buddy Krist Novoselic added drollery to the band's chaotic irreverence." Christgau later commented that while he found Endino's production "way too dry for grunge, a way of music that benefits from extra sputum", he nonetheless considered Bleach "a major album". Anthony Carew from About.com said that Bleach defined "the entire decade of the '90s" and argued that while Nirvana's later albums "were more widely acclaimed, caused a bigger cultural impact, and were generally more accomplished", "the band's essence was at its most essential on their debut."

Before Nevermind was released, Bleach had sold 40,000 copies in North America. The 1992 re-release of the album was more successful on the charts, with Bleach eventually reaching number 89 at the Billboard 200, number 33 on the UK album charts, number 34 on the Australian Recording Industry Association chart, and number 22 on the Finland charts. Kurt Cobain's death in April 1994 also led to a resurgence of popularity, with Bleach entering the Top Pop Catalog chart at number six in the week following his death, and eventually earning the top spot on May 7. The 2009 deluxe edition entered the Catalog Albums chart at number seven. Bleach was certified Platinum by the Recording Industry Association of America in February 1995, and had sold an estimated 1.9 million copies in the United States by September 2016. It has also been certified Gold by the Canadian Recording Industry Association. It is Sub Pop's best-selling album release to date.

Track listingNotes'''

 "Love Buzz" was replaced by "Big Cheese" on the 1989 UK release, but included on the 1992 UK CD reissue.
 "Big Cheese" was originally the B-side of "Love Buzz".
 "Downer" is included on the 1990 CD, but not the 1990 cassette. Included on both the 1992 CD and 1992 cassette.
The 20th anniversary live bonus track "Spank Thru" was previously released as a b-side on CD versions of the "Sliver" single in 1991.
The 20th anniversary live bonus track "Molly's Lips" was previously released as a single in January 1991.
The 20th anniversary live bonus track version of "About a Girl" was previously released as a b-side on CD and 12" vinyl versions of the "Sliver" single in 1991.

Personnel

Nirvana
Kurdt Kobain – vocals, guitar 
 Chris Novoselic – bass 
 Chad Channing – drums
 Jason Everman – guitar (pictured in the cover photo and credited, but he did not perform on the album)

 Additional personnel
 Dale Crover – drums on "Floyd the Barber", "Paper Cuts" and "Downer", backing vocals on "Downer"
 Jack Endino – producer
 Tracy Marander – photography
 Charles Peterson – photography
 Lisa Orth – design
 Jane Higgins – execution

Charts
Original 1989 release

1992 re-release

20th anniversary edition

Certifications

Release history

References

Further reading
Azerrad, Michael. Come as You Are: The Story of Nirvana. Doubleday, 1993. 
Berkenstadt, Jim; Cross, Charles. Nevermind: Nirvana. Music Sales Group, 2003. 
Cross, Charles. Heavier Than Heaven: A Biography of Kurt Cobain. Hyperion, 2001. 
Sandford, Christopher. Kurt Cobain. Da Capo Press, 2004. 
True, Everett. Nirvana – The True Story. Omnibus Press, 2006. 

External links

 Bleach'' at Discogs
 Live Nirvana Sessions History – Bleach
 Live Nirvana Companion to Official Releases – Bleach

1989 debut albums
Nirvana (band) albums
Grunge albums
Sub Pop albums
2009 live albums
Nirvana (band) live albums
Sub Pop live albums
Albums produced by Jack Endino